Rev. Luke Booker (20 October 1762 – 1 October 1835) LL.D., FRLS was an English Anglican clergyman, poet and antiquary, with a long list of published sermons and poetry. As a cleric he was strongly linked with the town of Dudley, then an exclave of Worcestershire.

Early years
Booker was born in Nottingham, England. As a young man, he pursued the religious studies of the Church of England, and took Holy Orders in 1785. Frederick Cornwallis, Bishop of Lichfield and Coventry ordained Booker without a title.

Career
Shortly after his ordination, Booker became a lecturer at St Peter's Collegiate Church, Wolverhampton, after which he became a curate at Oldswinford. Then for many years he served as vicar of Church of St. Edmund in Dudley. In 1806, he became rector of Tedstone Delamere, after an introduction by his brother-in-law, Richard Blakemore. He returned to Dudley in 1812 through his association with William Lord Viscount Dudley and Ward.

Booker laid the cornerstone for Dudley's St Thomas Church on 25 October 1816. He remained at Dudley until shortly before his death, having preached 173 sermons. During the Regency, Booker was one of the Chaplains in Ordinary to George IV. 

A charity preacher and an early contributor to the Anti-Jacobin Review and Magazine, Booker was a prolific publisher of poems and sermons, and at least one play. In 1823, he edited Poetical Blossoms by poet Robert Millhouse. He was a Fellow of the Royal Society of Literature, and a philanthropist. Booker also served as Justice of the Peace for the counties of Worcester, Hereford, and Stafford.

Personal life
Booker married four times. One marriage was to Ann, daughter of Thomas Blakemore. Ann and Luke Booker had two children. The son, Thomas William Booker, was adopted by Blakemore, raised at Melingriffith Tin Plate Works, and became MP for Herefordshire. The daughter was Harriet-Esther Booker.

Booker died at Bower Ashton, England on 1 October 1835. William J. Pringle's portrait of him is in the Dudley Museum's collection.

Political views
During his time at Dudley, Booker became involved in the controversy over political reform. In particular, he opposed the enfranchisement of Dudley both before and after the Reform Act 1832 had allowed the voters of Dudley to elect an MP for the first time in modern history.

Selected works
The Highlanders, a poem, 1778
Poems on subjects sacred, moral, and entertaining, 2 vols, 1785
A Sermon, preached in the parish church of old Swinford, Worcestershire, 1788
Miscellaneous Poems, 1789
A Sermon, preached at St. Edmund's church, in Dudley; and published for the purpose of erecting a monument, 1791
Britain's Happiness; an assize sermon ... exhibiting an historical review of providential interpositions in favour of the British Empire, 1792
A Sermon preached in the parish church of St. Thomas; at Dudley ... and an address to the common people, &c. on the subject of riots, 1793
Sermons on various subjects, 1793
Malvern, a descriptive and historical poem, 1798
The Hop-Garden, a didactic poem, 1799
A Discourse, (addressed chiefly to parents) on the duty and advantages of inoculating children, 1802
Calista; or, a picture of modern life, 1803
Poems, 1803
Tobias, a poem, 1805
A Moral Review of the Conduct and Case of Mary Ashford, in refutation of the arguments adduced in defence of her supposed violator and murderer, 1818
The Foundations of a Kingdom Endangered by Iniquity, and its ruin prevented by righteousness, 1820
Euthanasia; or, the state of man after death, 1822
A Descriptive and Historical Account of Dudley Castle, and its surrounding scenery; with graphic illustrations, 1825
Tributes to the Dead, consisting of ... epitaphs, 1830
The Champion of Cyrus: a drama, 1831
The Springs of Plynlimmon: a poem, 1834

References

External links
Oil painting of Luke Booker by William J. Pringle, part of the Dudley Museums Service collections

1762 births
1837 deaths
18th-century English Anglican priests
19th-century English Anglican priests
People from Nottingham
English male poets